The 1957 All-Ireland Senior Football Championship was the 71st staging of Ireland's premier Gaelic football knock-out competition.

Cork ended Galway's spell a All Ireland champions by just a point in the All Ireland semi-final.

Louth won their third, and so-far last, title.

Results

Connacht Senior Football Championship

Leinster Senior Football Championship

Munster Senior Football Championship

Ulster Senior Football Championship

All-Ireland Senior Football Championship

Championship statistics

Miscellaneous

 Wicklow record their first ever win over Meath.
 Waterford record their first win over Kerry since 1911.
 The Connacht final between Galway and Leitrim was the first game ever played at the new Pearse Stadium, in Galway named after both brothers of the 1916 rising Padraic Pearse and William Pearse.
 Louth win the All Ireland title for the first time since 1912.
 There were a number of first-time championship meetings: The All Ireland football semi-final between Louth and Tyrone and the All Ireland final between Louth and Cork.

References

All-Ireland Senior Football Championship